Events in the year 1893 in Japan.

Incumbents
Emperor: Emperor Meiji
Prime Minister: Itō Hirobumi

Governors
Aichi Prefecture: Tokito Konkyo
Akita Prefecture: Yasuhiko Hirayama
Aomori Prefecture: Masa Sawa
Ehime Prefecture: Katsumata Minoru
Fukui Prefecture: Kunizo Arakawa
Fukuoka Prefecture: Tameharu Yamada then Kojiro Iwasaki
Fukushima Prefecture: Yoshio Kusaka 
Gifu Prefecture: Toshi Kozaki then Michio Sokabe
Gunma Prefecture: Motootoko Nakamura
Hiroshima Prefecture: Nabeshima Miki
Ibaraki Prefecture: Takasaki
Iwate Prefecture: Ichizo Hattori
Kagawa Prefecture: Masao Tanimori then Baron Umashi Obata
Kochi Prefecture: Ishida Eikichi
Kumamoto Prefecture: Matsudaira Masanao
Kyoto Prefecture: Baron Akira Senda then Hiroshi Nakai
Mie Prefecture: Shangyi Narukawa
Miyagi Prefecture: Mamoru Funakoshi
Nagano Prefecture: Baron Utsumi Tadakatsu then Asada Tokunori
Niigata Prefecture: Senda Sada Akatsuki
Oita Prefecture: Baron Shirane Senitsu
Okinawa Prefecture: Kanji Maruoka
Osaka Prefecture: Nobumichi Yamada
Saga Prefecture: Takaya Nagamine
Saitama Prefecture: Tsunao Hayashi
Shimame Prefecture: Goro Shinozaki then Oura Kanetake
Tochigi Prefecture: Orita Hirauchi
Tokyo: Tomita Tetsunosuke
Toyama Prefecture: Tokuhisa Tsunenori
Yamagata Prefecture: Hasebe Ren

Events
Unknown date – Nagoya Life Insurance, as predecessor of T&D Holdings has founded.

Births
January 11 – Motoo Ōtaguro, music critic (d. 1979)
May 15 – Fusae Ichikawa, politician and women's suffrage leader (d. 1981)

Deaths
January 22 – Kawatake Mokuami, playwright (b. 1816)
June 6 – Terashima Munenori, diplomat (b. 1832)
December 5 – Matsudaira Katamori, samurai (b. 1836)

References

 
1890s in Japan
Japan
Years of the 19th century in Japan